Chimán   is a town and corregimiento in Chimán District, Panamá Province, Panama with a population of 1,205 as of 2010. It is the seat of Chimán District. Its population as of 1990 was 2,221; its population as of 2000 was 1,334.

References

Populated places in Panamá Province
Corregimientos of Panamá Province
Road-inaccessible communities of Panama
Geography of Panama